The 1953 National League Division One was the 19th season of speedway in the United Kingdom and the eighth post-war season of the highest tier of motorcycle speedway in Great Britain.

Summary
New Cross Rangers folded in June. Wembley Lions won their fifth consecutive title and their eighth overall.

Wimbledon Dons won the National Trophy for the fourth time and Harringay Racers completed a cup double winning the Coronation Cup and London Cup.

Novice rider Harry Eyre died in Poplar Hospital on 7 July 1953. He suffered fatal injuries earlier that evening at West Ham Stadium, in a second half novices match against Bradford.

National League Final table

New Cross Rangers withdrew mid-season - record expunged.

Coronation Cup final table
The Coronation Cup was run in a league format. Harringay Racers came out on top.

New Cross Rangers withdrew mid-season - record expunged.

Top Ten Riders (League only)

National Trophy
The 1953 National Trophy was the 16th edition of the Knockout Cup.

First round

Second round

Third round

Fourth round

Quarterfinals

Semifinals

Final

First leg

Second leg

Wimbledon were National Trophy Champions, winning on aggregate 110–106.

See also
 List of United Kingdom Speedway League Champions
 Knockout Cup (speedway)

References

Speedway National League
1953 in speedway
1953 in British motorsport